The Men's skeet event at the 2012 Olympic Games took place on 30 and 31 July 2012 at the Royal Artillery Barracks. The event consisted of two rounds: a qualifier and a final. In the qualifier, each shooter fired 5 sets of 25 shots in the set order of skeet shooting. The top 6 shooters in the qualifying round moved on to the final round. There, they fired one additional round of 25. The total score from all 150 shots was used to determine the final ranking.

Records
Prior to this competition, the existing world and Olympic records were as follows. 

Hancock improved his Olympic qualification record from the last Olympic with two points.

Hancock improved his Olympic record from the last Olympic with three points.

Qualification round

Final

References

Shooting at the 2012 Summer Olympics
Men's events at the 2012 Summer Olympics